Drachiella may refer to either
Drachiella (alga), a genus of red algae
Drachiella (crab), a genus of crabs